The Avocet Line is the railway line in Devon, England connecting Exeter with Exmouth. It was originally built by the London and South Western Railway, and was historically known as the Exmouth branch railway. The line follows the Exe Estuary for about half of its route, from just outside Topsham (on the Exmouth end) to Exmouth, giving views of the estuary. The line is named after the pied avocet, which lives in the estuary.

History
The line was constructed in 1861, connecting the City of Exeter and the port town of Exmouth, in England. It was built in two portions by two railway companies, but worked as a single entity.

A series of false starts

The City of Exeter lies on the river Exe in Devon, but the river is not navigable as far as the city. Exmouth, eleven miles further south on the east bank of the river at its mouth became important before the days of railways and reliable roads as the point of arrival for goods by coastal shipping, and the harbour there grew in importance. Topsham, also on the eastern bank of the river and only four miles from Exeter, also shared in growth.

The Exeter Ship Canal had been built in the sixteenth century to alleviate this problem, but use of the canal was inconvenient and limited to small vessels.

As early as 1825, Exeter merchants held a meeting to discuss the possibility of building a railway connection from Exmouth to the city. At this date there were no other railways nearby, and there was no thought of connecting the line to a network. However the proposal — estimated to cost £50,000 — was discontinued when the Corporation of the City of Exeter agreed to extend the canal southwards to Turf, opposite Topsham, enabling 400 ton vessels to reach the head of the canal by passing a difficult reach of the river channel.

In 1845 the Railway Mania was at its height, and two similar schemes for an "Exeter Topsham and Exmouth Railway" were publicised in August of that year. A few months later the Great Western Railway issued a prospectus for a "Great Western & Exeter, Topsham & Exmouth Junction Railway", and the South Devon Railway also issued a prospectus, proposing to run an atmospheric-powered broad gauge line from the Exminster pumping station, across the canal and crossing the River Exe on a 14-span viaduct to Topsham, and thence to Exmouth.

The financial frenzy subsided and the front-running proposal was to build a standard-gauge line from about the location of the present-day Exeter Central station, following the eastern bank of the river Exe and terminating at Exmouth. Joseph Locke was appointed engineer, and parliamentary authorisation was received on 3 July 1846 for the Exeter and Exmouth Railway. However the promoters had depended upon the standard-gauge London and South Western Railway (L&SWR) building a line reaching Exeter; their intention was to lease the line to the L&SWR. The larger company had been planning a line from Dorchester to Exeter, but at this stage they found that they could not finance the long route and cancelled the project, in effect killing the prospects of the E&E company as the powers expired.

The planned route of the Exeter and Exmouth scheme was revived in December 1853, and generated considerable support in Exmouth particularly, but the broad gauge interest countered with a revival of its scheme to make a branch from Exminster, crossing the river Exe by viaduct. By this time, broad gauge railways had been in Exeter since 1844, while in 1853 the standard gauge L&SWR was no closer than Salisbury, which it reached by a branch line from Bishopstoke (Eastleigh). Local people therefore considered the broad gauge railways a better partner, and an Exeter and Exmouth Railway Act was passed on 2 July 1855, for the broad gauge line from Exminster to Exmouth, crossing the Exe.

The first stages of constructing the line were proceeding and on 1 August 1857 the directors of the company announced that they had arranged with the Bristol and Exeter Railway and the South Devon Railway to lease their line for ten years at £3,000 per annum. However at the shareholder meeting, the shareholders appointed a committee to review the cost of the construction, (estimated at £94,435) and the committee reported back rejecting the lease to the broad gauge interest, and recommending altering the route of the line to join the anticipated route of the L&SWR into Exeter. The L&SWR had by now made real progress in constructing a direct line to Exeter, and its subsidiary, the Yeovil and Exeter Railway, undertook to make a branch line between Exeter and Topsham; the Exeter and Exmouth Company would confine its endeavours to the section between Topsham and Exmouth. The L&SWR would work the entire line for 50% of the gross receipts in proportion to the mileages respectively constructed. The costs of Topsham station and the quay line there would be shared,

A viable proposal at last
Suddenly the Exeter and Exmouth Railway had the mileage they had to construct substantially reduced (to about ) and avoided the river Exe bridge. Exmouth would get its railway.

A new Act of Parliament was needed to authorise the change of route and reduce the share capital, and this was obtained on 28 June 1858; the original capital had been £160,000 with authorisation for loans to £53,000 but this was now reduced to £50,000 share capital and £16,600 in loans. As the Exeter and Exmouth would now only build a line from Topsham to Exmouth, the L&SWR needed authority to build the part from Exmouth Junction to Topsham, and it obtained an Act for purpose on 12 July 1858. (The line joined the L&SWR Salisbury to Exeter main line at Exmouth Junction.) Just after opening the E&ER company raised an additional £30,000 in loans at 5% to cancel forfeited shares, and a further £25,000 was raised in June 1861.

The engineer of the line was W. R. Galbraith and the contractor for Topsham to Exmouth was James Taylor of Exeter, for the sum of £39,000. Not without setbacks, the line was completed and inspected by Col Yolland of the Railway Inspectorate on 27 April 1861, and the line opened on 1 May 1861. The first train was pulled by the 2-2-2 Beattie well tank no. 36 Comet.

Absorption of the Exeter and Exmouth Company by the L&SWR was authorised by Act of 5 July 1865, taking effect on 1 January 1865.

Train services in the nineteenth century

The branch line, operated as a single entity, was exceptionally successful, and 2,000 passengers a day used the line in the first week. Passenger trains in the early days were worked by Beattie 2-2-2 well tanks, with a varied collection of coaching stock transferred from elsewhere on the L&SWR system.

At first there were five trains each way seven days a week, increased to seven trains each way (but four on Sundays) from 1 July in the opening year.

Topsham Quay
Exmouth Dock did not exist at this time. In the early days the branch was only permitted to be worked during daylight.

The gradients were steeply falling to the quay, with sections at 1 in 38 and 1 in 44. Train movements were limited to eight wagons; there was a runaway in 1925 which ended up in the water. The main traffic in the 1930s was guano imported from South America, and destined for Odam's fertiliser factory, less than a mile away. The line closed in 1957.

Exmouth Harbour connection
The Exmouth Dock Railway was incorporated in 1864, a  extension of the Exeter and Exmouth company. It opened in 1866 and was absorbed into the L&SWR along with the Exmouth branch line as a whole.

The dock at Exmouth could take vessels up to 750 tons; most traffic was inwards, but outwards traffic included herrings for London. Wagons for the dock were propelled as there was no run-round facility there. Formal termination of the use of the dock took place in December 1967; the dock itself continued in use until December 1990.

Budleigh Salterton Railway

After a number of abortive attempts to get a railway to the town, the Budleigh Salterton Railway was incorporated on 20 July 1894, with powers to build a line from Tipton (later Tipton St Johns) on the Sidmouth Railway to Budleigh. The connection at Tipton gave access to the L&SWR's London to Exeter main line at Sidmouth Junction, and no direct connection towards Exmouth.

The line was worked by the L&SWR from its opening on 15 May 1897.

Exmouth and Salterton Railway
Promoters of a line to fill the gap between Budleigh Salterton and Exmouth formed the Exmouth and Salterton Railway. The L&SWR agreed to take over the scheme, and the line got parliamentary authority as part of an L&SWR Act on 25 July 1898. The contractors were Henry Lovatt & Sons and the engineer was J. W. Jacomb-Hood of the L&SWR, and the line was built as an integral part of the larger company. It opened on 1 June 1903, with an intermediate station at Littleham.

The L&SWR considered at this stage making the junction at Exmouth a triangle, enabling a through Exeter - Exmouth - Budleigh Salterton service, but this was dropped on grounds of cost. (On some Ordnance Survey maps a pathway is indicated on the alignment that the third leg of the triangle would take, but the pathway was on the bank of a stream and there is no evidence that such a line was seriously planned. Carter Avenue now occupies part of this alignment.)

Operation after 1903

By 1903 the network was complete, with a line from Exeter to Exmouth and a line from Sidmouth Junction to Exmouth.

From 1906 the L&SWR introduced steam railmotors in the Exeter area to Honiton on the main line, as a response to the competitive threat from street tramways. A new halt was opened at Lions Holt on 26 January 1906, between Exeter Central and Blackboy Tunnel, on the main line. (The halt was renamed St James' Park Halt on 6 October 1946 to emphasise the proximity to the local football ground.)

On 31 May 1908 the line between Exmouth Junction and Topsham was doubled. Two Drummond H13 class steam railcars, nos 5 and 6, had been operating local stopping services on the main line to Honiton, and from 1 June 1908 they (and presumably sister units) operated shuttle trains between Exeter Queen Street and Topsham also, with ten services each way (five on Sundays). Two additional halts were opened on the same day. Polsloe Bridge Halt was immediately on the Exmouth side of Exmouth Junction; it was extended in 1927. Clyst St Mary & Digby Halt was made of sleepers; the reference to Digby is to a hospital nearby. The halt was closed on 27 September 1948.

In 1916 the shuttle service to Topsham was discontinued and the railmotors withdrawn or transferred.

After 1923 the train service throughout to Exmouth increased to 20, and the peak was in 1963 with 31 each way, eighteen on Sundays.

The branch was significantly a commuter line for Exeter, as well as carrying holiday traffic, and during the steam era non-corridor stock for the majority although corridor stock was frequently used. Services mostly ran to and from Queen Street, later Central station at Exeter, using the bay platforms there.

Woodbury Road was renamed Exton on 15 September 1958.

Diesel multiple units were introduced on the branch from 15 July 1963.

In 1973 the double track section from Exmouth Junction to Topsham was singled (on 5 February), with Topsham having a crossing facility.

A new station was opened on 3 May 1976 called Lympstone Commando, adjacent to the Commando Training Centre of the Royal Marines. There was already a Lympstone station and it was renamed Lympstone Village on 13 May 1991. On 23 May 1995 Digby & Sowton station was opened near the site of the earlier Clyst St Mary & Digby halt; it was funded by Devon County Council and Tesco plc. Newcourt railway station opened on 4 June 2015.

Route

The towns and cities served are:
Exeter (including the suburbs of Stoke Hill, Whipton, Digby, Sowton and Newcourt)
Topsham
Exton
Lympstone
Exmouth

The route follows the West of England Main Line in the suburbs of Exeter before diverging to the south.

There is a ferry service from Exmouth harbour to Starcross railway station on the opposite shore of the River Exe.

Services
Trains only stop once an hour at St James Park, Polsloe Bridge, Exton and Lympstone Commando, the latter two being request stops. Between 2006 and 2020 it was operated by Great Western Railway, using , 150 or 153 diesel multiple units (DMUs) either singly or in multiple. Between December 2007 and December 2011  DMUs were also used. Since 2020 it has been chiefly operated using 150 or 166 diesel multiple units as 3, or 4 car formations.

Infrastructure
The line is double track from Exeter St Davids to Exmouth Junction, but is single thereafter except for a passing loop at Topsham, where many trains are scheduled to cross each other. All movements on the line are under the control of the signal box at Exmouth Junction, which remotely operates the level crossing at Topsham as well as the loop there.

Passenger volume
The busiest station on the branch is Exmouth, which is the fifth busiest in Devon. The numbers of passengers using the line each year have shown an increase in particular Digby & Sowton and St James Park. Comparing all stations on the year beginning April 2002 to the Year beginning April 2010 there are a variety of trends. The biggest increases have been at Digby & Sowton by 157% and St James Park with 105%. The increases in descending order from there are Topsham by 89%, Polsloe Bridge by 82%, Exton by 60%, Lympstone Village by 31% and the smallest with Exmouth by 6%. Meanwhile, Lympstone Commando has declined by 33%.

References

Scenic railway lines in Devon and Cornwall
Rail transport in Devon
Transport in Exeter
Railway lines in South West England
Standard gauge railways in England
Railway lines opened in 1862